Tyler Gron (born September 7, 1989) is a Canadian professional ice hockey player. He is currently playing for the Bayreuth Tigers in the DEL2.

Gron played junior hockey in the Alberta Junior Hockey League before committing to the Northern Michigan Wildcats men's ice hockey team which competes in the NCAA's Division I in the Central Collegiate Hockey Association (CCHA) conference.

Awards and honours

References

External links

Living people
1989 births
Bloomington Blaze (CHL) players
Bridgeport Sound Tigers players
Canadian ice hockey centres
Esbjerg Energy players
Fort McMurray Oil Barons players
Heilbronner Falken players
Idaho Steelheads (ECHL) players
Kassel Huskies players
Löwen Frankfurt players
Northern Michigan Wildcats men's ice hockey players
Ontario Reign (ECHL) players
Reading Royals players
San Francisco Bulls players
Spruce Grove Saints players
Worcester Sharks players